The 2006–07 Combined Counties Football League season was the 29th in the history of the Combined Counties Football League, a football competition in England.

Premier Division

The Premier Division featured eight new teams in a league of 22 teams after the promotion of Godalming Town to the Isthmian League.
Teams joining from disbanded Isthmian League Division Two:
Camberley Town
Chertsey Town
Dorking
Egham Town
Epsom & Ewell
Wembley
Plus:
Banstead Athletic, demoted from Isthmian League Division One
Bookham, promoted from Division One

Also Guildford United changed their name to Guildford City.

League table

Division One

Division One featured seven new teams in a league of 21 teams.
Teams joining from the Middlesex County League:
CB Hounslow United
South Park
Teams relegated from the Premier Division:
Farnham Town
Feltham
Frimley Green
Horley Town
Westfield

Also, Monotype changed their name to Salfords and Netherne changed their name to Coulsdon Town.

League table

References

 League tables

External links
 Combined Counties League Official Site

2006-07
9